A puerta cerrada (English language: Closed Door) is a 1962 Argentine film directed and written by Pedro Escudero, adapted from the play Huis Clos by Jean-Paul Sartre.

Release
The film was released  on 5 September 1962.

Cast
 María Aurelia Bisutti
 Carlos Brown
 Elsa Dorian
 Mario Horna
 Miguel A. Irarte
 Miguel Angel Iriarte
 Inda Ledesma
 Duilio Marzio
 Susana Mayo
 Mirta Miller
 Frank Nelson
 Manuel Rosón
 Orlando Sacha

External links
 

1962 films
1960s Spanish-language films
Argentine films based on plays
1962 drama films
Argentine drama films
1960s Argentine films